Superache is the second studio album by American singer and songwriter Conan Gray, released on June 24, 2022, through Republic Records. It is a follow-up to Gray's debut album Kid Krow (2020). Described by Gray as an expansion of his yearning heartbreak, the album touches on themes such as childhood trauma, abuse, friendship, and love, as of his experiences growing up.

Superache was preceded by the singles "Astronomy", "People Watching", "Jigsaw", "Memories", and "Yours", while standalone singles "Overdrive" and "Telepath" were included as bonus tracks on the Japanese edition. The record been described as a pop album, that contain elements of dance-pop, synth-pop, and indie pop. The album was met with critical acclaim from critics, praising Gray's vocal performance, production, honest lyricism and different style compared to its predecessor. The album debuted at number nine on the US Billboard 200, with 43,000 album-equivalent units and spent 12 weeks on the chart.

Background 
Gray told Tomas Mier of Rolling Stone that this album was designed to be centered around the song "Family Line" which was inspired by "childhood trauma and generational trauma [and his] rough upbringing", and the song "Best Friend" about his childhood best friend Ashley.

Tour 
Superache Tour is the ongoing fourth headlining tour by American singer-songwriter Conan Gray, in support of his second studio album Superache. The tour began on September 16, 2022, in Louisville, Kentucky and is scheduled to end on March 26, 2023 in Bogotá, Colombia. The tour will visit thirteen countries across four continents (North America, Oceania, Asia & South America). Gray also played at the Haus of Wonder Festival in Seoul, South Korea on August 6 and 7, 2022 before the tour began.

Shows

Cancelled Shows

Critical reception 

Superache was met with critical acclaim from music critics after its release. On Metacritic, which assigns a normalized score out of 100 to ratings from publications, the album received a score of 81 based on 4 reviews, indicating "universal acclaim".

Georgia Evans of NME gave the album four out of five stars, and wrote "it may be theatrical, but 'Superache' still feels deep and honest. Cut through the crescendoes and you'll find real tenderness. 'I'll just take a footnote in your life / And you could take my body / Every line I would write for you,' he sings on 'Footnote', inspired by Pride and Prejudice and the realisation that unrequited love doesn't match up to fictional romance. That's OK, though: Gray knows this kind of all-encompassing love is painful – and he's ready to feel it at full force. Gem Stokes of Clash wrote "'Superache' is a definitive evolution for Gray. A matured turn since his debut 'Kid Krow', 'Superache' continues to exemplify Gray's flair for pop bops, but with ripened introspection". Matt Collar of AllMusic wrote "Superache is a bigger, more robust record than 2020's Kid Krow, while still retaining, and in many ways expanding upon, the heartfelt diaristic qualities that made Gray such a poster child for sad Internet teens". Maura Johnston of Rolling Stone wrote "On his second album, the 23-year-old YouTuber turned pop star reveals himself to be an astute observer of the human condition, recounting everyday scenes and highlighting those split-second details in interactions that can make a warm rapport between two people transform into permafrost".

Commercial performance 
Superache debuted at number nine on the US Billboard 200, with 43,000 album-equivalent units. It marked Gray's second consecutive entry on the top ten of the chart.

Track listing 

Notes
  indicates an additional producer

Personnel
Musicians
 Conan Gray – lead and background vocals (all tracks), baritone (track 3), acoustic guitar (9)
 Dan Nigro – acoustic guitar (1, 4, 5, 8–12), background vocals (1, 2, 4–12), bass (1, 2, 4, 6–8, 10, 12), drum programming (1, 2, 4, 6, 8, 10–12), electric guitar (1, 2, 5, 7, 8, 10, 12), piano (1, 2, 4–6, 8, 12), synthesizer programming (1, 6, 8, 10), percussion (2, 12), synthesizer (2), organ (6, 11), drums (7, 11), programming (7)
 Julia Michaels – background vocals (2)
 Sterling Laws – drums (2, 6)
 Ryan Linvill – programming (2, 5), bass (5, 8, 10–12), saxophone (6, 12), drum programming (8, 10), synthesizer programming (8, 12), electric guitar (11)
 Cirkut – drum programming, keyboards, synthesizer programming (3)
 Ben Romans – piano (11)
 Paul Cartwright – viola, violin (12)

Technical
 Randy Merrill – mastering
 Serban Ghenea – mixing (1–3, 11)
 Mitch McCarthy – mixing (4, 6–10, 12)
 Daniel Nigro – mixing (5), engineering (1, 2, 4–12)
 Ryan Linvill – engineering (1, 2, 4–12)
 Cirkut – engineering (3)

Artwork
 Conan Gray – creative direction, art direction, design
 Ryan Rogers – art direction
 Connor Dewhurst – design
 Brian Ziff – photography

Charts

Release history

Notes

References 

2022 albums
Conan Gray albums
Republic Records albums